Penicillium brunneum is an anamorph fungus species of the genus of Penicillium which was isolated in imported rice an produces rugulosin a substance which is hepatocarcinogenic to mice and rats.

See also
List of Penicillium species

References

Further reading

    
 
 

brunneum
Fungi described in 1959